Sir James Stuart, 1st Baronet of Oxford (March 2, 1780 – July 14, 1853) was a lawyer, judge, and political figure in Lower Canada.

Personal life 
He was born in Fort Hunter, New York, in 1780, the son of the Anglican priest John Stuart, a United Empire Loyalist. He studied at King's College in Windsor, Nova Scotia and then apprenticed in law in Lower Canada with John Reid and then Jonathan Sewell; he was called to the bar in 1801.

Politics 
Stuart served as personal secretary for Lieutenant Governor Sir Robert Shore Milnes. In 1805, he was named solicitor general for the province. Stuart was elected to the Legislative Assembly of Lower Canada for Montreal East in 1808 and was reelected in 1809. He supported the Parti canadien in the assembly. He was defeated in 1810, but elected for Montreal County in an 1811 by-election and served as leader of the Parti canadien, replacing Pierre-Stanislas Bédard. In 1814, he was elected for both Montreal and Buckingham counties and chose to represent Montreal; he was reelected in 1816. In the assembly, Stuart led the attack against the judges Jonathan Sewell and James Monk; it was felt that by revising the rules of practice for the courts, these judges had stepped outside of their jurisdiction and taken on authority that should have been under the control of the legislature. After his party lost interest in pursuing this issue after 1817, Stuart lost interest in the affairs of the assembly. He was not reelected in 1820.

Unlike his former party, Stuart supported the union of Upper and Lower Canada proposed in 1822. In 1825, he was named Attorney General for Lower Canada. He was elected to the assembly for the riding of William-Henry in an 1825 by-election, now a supporter of the British party; he was defeated by Wolfred Nelson in the general election held in 1827. Stuart was named to the Executive Council of Lower Canada in 1827 and served until the union of Upper and Lower Canada in 1841. He was dismissed as attorney general in 1832, after having been accused by the assembly of conflict of interest in a case involving the Hudson's Bay Company, which had retained Stuart as its attorney, and other abuses of his position. He was offered the position of Chief Justice for Colony of Newfoundland as a form of compensation, but refused this offer and returned to private practice. He served as a member of the Special Council that governed the province after the Lower Canada Rebellion and was president of this council from 1839 to 1841. Stuart was also named Chief Justice of Lower Canada in 1838. In 1841, he was created a baronet, of Oxford in the County of Oxford.

He died at Quebec City in 1853.

His brother Andrew was also a lawyer and a long-time member of the legislative assembly. His nephew George Okill Stuart later served in the legislative assembly for the Province of Canada and also as a mayor of Quebec City.

References

External links
 
 

Members of the Legislative Assembly of Lower Canada
Members of the Special Council of Lower Canada
Chief justices of Lower Canada
Canadian baronets
Baronets in the Baronetage of the United Kingdom
1780 births
1853 deaths
People from Montgomery County, New York
United Empire Loyalists
Canadian Anglicans
Attorneys-General of Lower Canada
Anglophone Quebec people